Primal (also known as Genndy Tartakovsky’s Primal) is an American adult animated action horror television series created and directed by Genndy Tartakovsky for Cartoon Network's late night programming block Adult Swim. It is the first horror television series from Cartoon Network Studios and Williams Street. Primal is set in a deliberately anachronistic vision of prehistory, portraying dinosaurs, prehistoric hominids, and Iron Age Homo sapiens as coexisting within the same barbaric time period and incorporating many elements of fantasy, horror, action, and adventure. The first 10-episode season of Primal was split into two 5-episode parts. The series premiered on Adult Swim on October 8, 2019, with the remaining episodes releasing daily that same week. The second half of the season premiered one episode April 1, 2020, with the remaining episodes premiering weekly for the five weeks following October 4, 2020. In August 2020, the series was renewed for a 10-episode second season, which premiered July 22 and concluded September 16, 2022. Following the second season finale and conclusion of Spear and Fang's storyline, Tartakovsky confirmed that Primal would become an anthology series from its forthcoming third season onward.

Primal has received widespread critical acclaim, with much praise for its animation, storytelling, music, emotional depth, horror elements and editing. The show has won three Outstanding Individual Achievement in Animation Juried Awards from the Emmy for Storyboard Artist (Genndy Tartakovsky), Art Director (Scott Wills), and Character Designer (Stephen DeStefano).

Premise
Set in an anachronistic and fantastical prehistoric world, the premise is a bond between a Neanderthal named Spear and a female Tyrannosaurus rex  named Fang as they struggle to survive, encountering various dangerous fauna and people that live in their world while also encountering different creatures and Iron Age homo sapiens.

Characters
In comparison to Tartakovsky's other shows where there are multiple characters, Primal initially only features Spear and Fang in the show as they encounter different prehistoric or fantastical species and various tribes of hominins. Tartakovsky stated that although the show is a work of fantasy, the prehistoric animals, modern creatures and futuristic beasts in the show are based on real prehistoric animals, as well as some new ones created by the artists involved in the project.

Main
 Spear (voiced by Aaron LaPlante; Noah Bentley (young)) – A Neanderthal whose mate and two children are attacked and devoured by a pack of horned Tyrannosaurs. Although he overcomes his initial urge to commit suicide, Spear is still learning to cope with the loss. Eventually, he develops a deep bond with Fang and is willing to make any personal sacrifice to protect her. (seasons 1–2)
 Fang – A teal female Tyrannosaurus whose hatchlings are killed by the same horned Tyrannosaur pack that killed Spear's family. Unlike Spear, who is still traumatized and dealing with the loss of his loved ones, Fang is able to cope with hers much quicker. Initially, she attempts to assert her dominance over Spear but eventually learns that it is far healthier to work in a partnership than with a pack mentality and is willing to do anything to ensure his survival.
 Mira (voiced by Laëtitia Eïdo) – A virtuous Arabic-speaking human. Enslaved and branded with a scorpion symbol by a Viking clan, Mira escapes and encounters Spear and Fang, who become her new friends and companions. She proves to be very capable with archery, spears, axes, carpentry, helmsmanship, and cooking. (season 2; guest: season 1)
 Charles (voiced by Jacob Dudman) – A scientist and member of the Historical Society who theorizes about the correlation between the primitive and modern man. ("The Primal Theory")
 Darlington (voiced by Jeremy Crutchley) – An English scientist and former boxing champion whose manor hosts a Historical Society of well-educated scientists. ("The Primal Theory")

Recurring

Season 1
 Spear's family – Spear's mate, son, and daughter that were eaten by a pack of horned Tyrannosaurs in the first episode, but reappear through visions and flashbacks across the series.
 Fang's first brood – Fang's first two hatchlings. Like Spear's family, they were eaten in the first episode, but reappear through visions and flashbacks across the series.

Season 2
 The Chieftain (voiced by Fred Tatasciore) – The chieftain of the Viking tribe responsible for abducting Mira's people. He soon seeks revenge on Spear and Fang for decimating his tribe. Following his son Eldar's death, the Chieftain is transformed into a monstrous, fiery giant by the demonic entity in order to kill Spear and Fang in exchange for Eldar's soul.
 Eldar (voiced by Fred Tatasciore) – The Chieftain's eldest son. He joins his father on their quest for revenge against Spear and Fang for their tribe's destruction.
 Demonic Entity – The lord of the fiery underworld who makes a deal with the Chieftain to have him kill Spear and Fang and bring him their souls in exchange for Eldar's soul.
 Ima (voiced by Amina Koroma) – A tyrannical and ruthless Egyptian queen who resides in a large city-ship called the Colossaeus filled with her warriors and slaves that she uses to raid and loot other kingdoms.
 Kamau (voiced by Imari Williams) – A giant African man who, while naturally peaceful, is also immensely strong and was enslaved by Ima along with his similarly-sized tribe. It is revealed that Ima is holding his daughter Amal hostage, which serves as leverage to force him to obey her.
 Amal (voiced by Hillary Hawkins) – Kamau's daughter.
 Fang's second brood – Fang's second set of hatchlings that were born after she mated with a Tyrannosaurus named Red. While one was killed before hatching, the other two live to adulthood.

Production

Conception and development
According to Tartakovsky, Primal was an early piece of work he scrapped because it did not click with him at the time. As he learned more and more about what drew people in to his shows, he wanted to experiment with those artistic traits, particularly the use of no dialogue and slow moments. He also stated that the method in which he approached animated projects began to slow down in terms of energy, and by the time he finished working on Hotel Transylvania 3: Summer Vacation , it had come full circle. He said he was inspired by Conan the Barbarian and vintage pulp novels, as well as films such as The Revenant. Tartakovsky felt that people would not take the show seriously because they were "breaking the rules" by having "a man and a dinosaur together," so he emphasized that it is a character study, a "buddies" journey about two characters who are very different but bonded by tragedy.

The first season consists of 10 episodes. On August 31, 2020, the series was renewed for a second season which consists of 10 episodes.

Episodes

Series overview

Season 1 (2019–20)

Season 2 (2022)

Broadcast
The first season premiered on October 8, 2019, with episodes from the first half of the season airing daily from the premiere date. An episode from the second half was shown during Adult Swim's April Fools' Day 2020 run. Adult Swim announced on their Twitter that the second half would start airing on October 4, 2020.

The first season of Primal was broadcast during Thanksgiving weekend on Adult Swim's Toonami programming block for the first time on November 29, 2020. The marathon commemorated the launch of the series on the HBO Max streaming service. The first season began a second run on the normal schedule of the Toonami block beginning on May 15, 2022. The second season encored on the block on July 24, 2022.

Home media
The first season was released on DVD and Blu-ray on June 1, 2021 by Warner Bros. Home Entertainment. It was later released in France, the Netherlands and Belgium. The second season will be released on DVD and Blu-ray on April 25, 2023.

Reception

Critical response
Initial reception for Primal was highly positive; much praise was given to the art and animation, the use of storytelling with no dialogue, and the balancing of the show's interpretation of violence and beauty. In a review from IndieWire, Steve Greene wrote "Primal is a piece of elemental storytelling that finds some real emotional depth without either of its protagonists uttering a single word of dialogue", ultimately giving the series an "A−". On Rotten Tomatoes, the first season has an approval rating of 100% based on reviews from 23 critics, with an average rating of 9.10/10. The site's critical consensus states: "Epic in every sense, Genndy Tartakovsky's Primal is a stunning feat of visual storytelling." The second season has an approval rating of 100% based on reviews from 7 critics, with an average rating of 9.30/10. On Metacritic, the series has a weighted average score of 87 out of 100 based on 5 critic reviews, indicating "universal acclaim".

Awards and nominations

Future
After the second season finale "Echoes of Eternity" aired on September 16, 2022, Genndy Tartakovsky confirmed that while Spear and Fang's story was officially concluded, he was formulating a third season for the series with a focus on new characters, intending for Primal to become an anthology series, inspired by the stand-alone second season episode "The Primal Theory". While no official release date has been announced, Tartakovsky said that he intends to develop the season after completing his work on New Line Cinema's Fixed.

Notes

References

External links
 
 
 

2010s American adult animated television series
2020s American adult animated television series
2019 American television series debuts
Adult Swim original programming
American action adventure television series
American adult animated action television series
American adult animated adventure television series
American adult animated drama television series
American adult animated fantasy television series
American adult animated horror television series
Animated television series about dinosaurs
Animated thriller television series
Anime-influenced Western animated television series
Annie Award winners
Emmy Award-winning programs
English-language television shows
Fiction about neanderthals
Films with screenplays by Genndy Tartakovsky
Human trafficking in fiction
Slavery in fiction
Television series by Cartoon Network Studios
Television series by Williams Street
Television series created by Genndy Tartakovsky
Television series set in prehistory